Vladimir Yordanov Zafirov (born 21 March 1983) is a Bulgarian football player who plays as a defender.

Honours

Club
Beroe
Bulgarian Cup (1): 2012–13
Bulgarian Supercup (1): 2013

References

External links

1983 births
Living people
Bulgarian footballers
First Professional Football League (Bulgaria) players
Neftochimic Burgas players
OFC Sliven 2000 players
FC Chernomorets Balchik players
FC Etar 1924 Veliko Tarnovo players
PFC Beroe Stara Zagora players
FC Vereya players
Association football defenders
Sportspeople from Sliven